The Museum of Broadcast Communications (MBC) is an American museum, the stated mission of which is "to collect, preserve, and present historic and contemporary radio and television content as well as educate, inform and entertain through our archives, public programs, screenings, exhibits, publications and online access to our resources." It is located in Chicago.

Museum locations (1987–present)
The Museum of Broadcast Communications was founded in 1982 but didn't open until June 1987 in the River City condominium complex, located at 800 S. Wells St. It remained there until June 1992, when it moved to the Chicago Cultural Center. The MBC then left the Cultural Center in December 2003, with plans to open in a new building of its own at 360 N. State St. in 2005. Subsequently, construction of the new MBC experienced various delays and setbacks, with construction stopping in 2006 and the half-completed building slated to be sold in December 2008, which MBC founder and president Bruce DuMont blamed on a lack of $6 million in state funding that had reportedly been promised to the museum three years earlier.

On November 7, 2009, DuMont announced that funding for the museum from the state of Illinois had finally been obtained and that construction would begin once again. Seven months later, Governor Pat Quinn stated that Illinois would give the MBC a capital grant of $6 million to help complete its construction. (In December 2009 the MBC held a construction fundraiser in Oak Park, Illinois, where DuMont was living at the time. The event's headliner was Bill Jackson, the creator and host of the children's program The BJ and Dirty Dragon Show, which aired on Chicago TV from 1968 to '74, originally as Cartoon Town.)

The new 62,000-square-foot MBC was back under construction in 2010. It was set to include expanded areas for collection development, two exhibit galleries, and working radio and television studios.  The State of Illinois set a deadline of May 2011 to finish basic interior work and landscaping, but because of cold weather, the museum was given a 30-day extension on its original April 30 deadline.

Shortly before the museum reopened, the Chicago Tribune reported that Bruce DuMont had obtained the aforementioned $6 million grant "after telling the state he intended to create 200 year-long construction jobs and 19 museum staff positions (15 full-time jobs and four part-time ones)," but he expected the museum to have only 11 part-time workers by the time of the reopening and said that 180–200 construction workers, employed for as much as ten months and as little as several days, helped finish the new building. When asked to explain why the number, and duration, of jobs created was lower than what he'd promised to the state legislature, Dumont replied, in an email, "If the MBC can manage our operations with fewer people and do so efficiently, we will do so, just like the Chicago Tribune has done." DuMont told the Tribune that waiters, hotel employees, and other members of the service industry would find employment, presumably in restaurants and hotels surrounding the museum, because of the reopening, and that the MBC could inspire people to seek out careers in broadcasting. "I think inspiration is a form of job creation," DuMont said, "because it changes one life."

After being dormant for eight and a half years as a brick-and-mortar destination, the museum reopened in its new location at 360 N. State St. on June 13, 2012, exactly 25 years after it first opened its doors. (Technically, the National Radio Hall of Fame gallery, located on the second floor of the museum, had been open to the public since December 1, 2011.) The pre-opening ceremony on June 12 included actors John Mahoney (Frasier) and Betty White (The Golden Girls) and newscaster Hugh Downs (20/20).
 
According to a February 2011 press release centered on the MBC's partnership with Cleversafe to provide online access to its archives, roughly 70,000 registered users and 4.5 million unique visitors had accessed the MBC's 400,000 online videos between 2009 and early 2011, and more than "240,000 visitors from across the country are projected for the [museum's] first year of operation." However, museum attendance "dropped drastically, from 225,000 annual visitors when MBC was at the Cultural Center and free to 7,300 last year at the current entrance fee of $12," reported the Chicago Reader in May 2015. "Then in 2013, what DuMont describes as a 'server crash' destroyed access to the 10 percent of the museum's archive of radio and television programming that had been digitized and made available to the public for free."

In December 2012 Crain's Chicago Business reported that the MBC "now owes less than $3 million on a mortgage held by Pepper [Construction, the contractor for the State St. facility] and has arranged another three years for paying down that debt." (The Chicago Reader had previously reported, in November 2009, a mortgage total of $4.79 million "that'll come due in 2011.") More than four and a half years later, in July 2017, Crain's revealed that the MBC's mortgage deadline had been pushed back from the end of 2015 to the end of 2017, and that as of August 2016 the museum "owed $2.5 million to Pepper Construction"; furthermore, "the museum posted $53,674 in ticket revenue" in 2015 along with "an operating deficit of $561,331, according to its tax filing for that year, the most recent available." Four weeks later Crain's reported that Pepper Construction had granted the MBC another year to pay off its debt, extending the mortgage deadline to December 31, 2018.

In September 2017 the MBC announced the debut of "Saturday Night Live: The Experience," a 12,000-square-foot exhibit acquired from Premier Exhibitions that was set to open the following month and run through the end of 2018 on the museum's second and fourth floors. "It's a grab for the gold ring," MBC president Bruce DuMont told the Chicago Tribune. "I think it's going to dramatically change the museum for the better. We're very excited about it. There's going to be more attention, more traffic, more buzz about the things we do here." (Premier Exhibitions filed for bankruptcy protection in June 2016.)

On March 2, 2018, media blogger Robert Feder reported that the museum was "looking to sell two floors of its four-story building at 360 North State Street." "We simply are looking at options to improve the future educational and entertainment experience for our patrons," said MBC board chairman Larry Wert. "Any proceeds would put the institution on a solid financial foundation." Wert, Tribune Media's president of broadcast media, was elected interim chairman of the MBC board in October 2016, less than two months after Bruce DuMont announced that he planned to retire as the museum's president. (Until Wert became the interim chairman of the board, the position had "been vacant since 1995 when the late Arthur C. Nielsen Jr. stepped down after 11 years," wrote Feder that October.)

However, shortly after DuMont made his announcement in August 2016, the website Chicagoland Radio and Media reported, "Officially, DuMont is voluntarily retiring from the MBC, claiming the decision is entirely his own, although in reality, there is far more behind it," including alleged financial mismanagement and controversy surrounding his personal life; additionally, DuMont would "remain at least until a successor has been found and begun in the MBC President role. This could take up to a year." DuMont's final two-year term as president ended on December 31, 2017, without a successor in place, but on March 19, 2018, Robert Feder reported that Julian Jackson, formerly the vice president of design at the Milwaukee Public Museum, had been named the MBC's new executive director.

Nearly six months later, on September 17, 2018, Feder reported that the MBC's board of directors was close to finalizing a deal to sell the museum's third and fourth floors to Fern Hill, a real estate development and investment firm. "Sources said the agreement will net $6 million, to be used to continue operating the museum and paying down debt – especially a $3.7 million mortgage held by Pepper Construction Co.," Feder wrote. The deal closed on March 1, 2019, with executive director Julian Jackson telling Feder, "When we open the next phase of the permanent museum, we plan on providing a state-of-the-art experience to all of our guest [sic], while delivering brand value to our sponsors and supporters." That same week the Chicago Tribune reported that the MBC was "negotiating with Cleveland’s Rock and Roll Hall of Fame to bring two special exhibitions here beginning in June," and that after the March 31 closing of "Saturday Night Live: The Experience," which had been held over for three months, the museum's second floor was "expected to be closed for at least April and May" as the MBC reduced its exhibition and event space "from 25,000 square feet to 12,500." On March 18, 2019, Robert Feder reported that Julian Jackson had resigned as the MBC's executive director after one year, having told the board of directors that he'd "accepted a new position with Freeman Exhibit Solutions in Schiller Park."

"Louder Than Words: Rock, Power & Politics," on loan from the Rock and Roll Hall of Fame, opened on May 24, 2019, for a three-month run on the MBC's second floor. On July 26 Robert Feder reported that Susy Schultz, president of the Chicago nonprofit Public Narrative and a former journalist for the Chicago Sun-Times, had been named the museum's new executive director, effective August 19. (David Plier, the CEO of Retail First Corp. and a weekend host on WGN 720 AM, replaced Larry Wert as the chairman of the MBC board at the end of June.) In its July 26 story on Schultz's hiring, the Chicago Tribune reported that the Rock and Roll Hall of Fame's exhibit "Stay Tuned: Rock on TV" was scheduled to open in October, and "the museum next year plans to remodel its primary exhibition space on the second floor and remake its central exhibition on television history," according to MBC officials.

The MBC temporarily closed its doors on March 15, 2020, because of the COVID-19 health crisis, and announced that it would "be accelerating the release of its online curriculum for 'The Great Debates,' which examines the impact of the broadcast industry on the campaign for the presidency. It was scheduled to be released when the exhibit opens this summer, but that will be moved up to early April."

In October 2021 the Chicago Tribune reported, "After closing in March 2020, MBC opened briefly that summer. Poor attendance forced the museum closed again, and they chose to focus on educational programs and an online lecture series prior to a soft reopening" on October 2, 2021, with a "grand reopening" taking place later that month.

National Radio Hall of Fame

Until October 2017, when "Saturday Night Live: The Experience" opened, the second floor of the museum was the location of the National Radio Hall of Fame (NRHOF) gallery. (When the SNL exhibit closed in the spring of 2019 and the MBC sold the third and fourth floors of its building, the NRHOF gallery was partially restored on the second floor.) The NRHOF has been affiliated with the MBC since 1991. (The museum was also home to the American Advertising Federation's Advertising Hall of Fame from 1992 to 2000.)

Encyclopedia of Television
Encyclopedia of Television, edited by Horace Newcomb, has more than 1,000 online essays.
“The most definitive resource on the history of television worldwide.” – Library Journal

See also
20th Century Technology Museum
Museum of Radio and Technology
Paley Center for Media
The Museum of Classic Chicago Television

References

External links
Museum of Broadcast Communications website
National Radio Hall of Fame website

History of broadcasting
History of radio
History of television in the United States
Media museums in Illinois
Museums in Chicago
Telecommunications museums in the United States
Television preservation